Õnne  is an Estonian language feminine given name, derived from õnne, the genitive singular / attributive form of õnn, meaning "(good) luck" and "happiness".  

As of 1 January 2022, 366 women in Estonia bear the name Õnne, making it the 372nd most popular female name in the country. The name is most common in Hiiu County, where 8.37 per 10,000 inhabitants of the county bear the name. 

Notable individuals named Õnne include:

 Õnne Kepp (born 1955), literary scholar
 Õnne Kurg (born 1973), cross-country skier
 Õnne Pärl (born 1965), journalist and photographer
 Õnne Pillak (born 1983), politician
 Õnne Pollisinski (born 1951), swimmer and swimming coach

See also
 Õnne 13

Refernences

Estonian feminine given names